Patrick Stirling (29 June 1820 – 11 November 1895) was a Scottish railway engineer, and Locomotive Superintendent of the Great Northern Railway of England. His father Robert Stirling was also an engineer. His brother James Stirling was also a locomotive engineer. His son Matthew Stirling was CME of the Hull and Barnsley Railway. Another son, Patrick Stirling played for Doncaster Rovers and was mayor of Doncaster.

Career
Patrick Stirling was Locomotive Superintendent of the Glasgow and South Western Railway from 1853 to 1866. He came in 1866 to the GNR, where he constructed several locomotive types. He was succeeded by Henry Ivatt.

Stirling single
Stirling's most famous construction was the 4-2-2 steam locomotive Stirling single called "eight-footer" because of the 8 ft 1 in diameter driving wheel. That engine type set speed records during the race to the north with average train speed between engine changing of more than 60 mph in 1895.

References

External links
 http://www.steamindex.com/people/stirling.htm
 http://www.lner.info/eng/stirling.shtml

1820 births
1895 deaths
Locomotive builders and designers
Scottish railway mechanical engineers
Great Northern Railway (Great Britain) people
Glasgow and South Western Railway people